St Boswells railway station was a railway station that served the villages of Newtown St Boswells and St Boswells, Scottish Borders, Scotland from 1849 to 1969 on the Waverley Route.

History 
The station opened on 1 November 1849 as Newtown Junction by the North British Railway. The station was situated on both sides of the B6398. The name changed to New Town St Boswells in January 1853 and to St Boswells on 1 March 1865. The goods yard was north of the station and had three sidings, one of which passed through a timber goods shed. The yard was later extended to the east with further sidings that served the Southern Central Market. The goods shed closed in November 1959. The station was closed to passengers on 6 January 1969 but remained open for goods traffic until 28 April 1969.

References

External links 

Disused railway stations in the Scottish Borders
Former North British Railway stations
Railway stations in Great Britain opened in 1849
Railway stations in Great Britain closed in 1969
Beeching closures in Scotland
1849 establishments in Scotland
1969 disestablishments in Scotland